The 1933 North Dakota Fighting Sioux football team, also known as the Nodaks, was an American football team that represented the University of North Dakota in the North Central Conference (NCC) during the 1933 college football season. In its sixth year under head coach Charles A. West, the team compiled a 3–5–1 record (1–2–1 against NCC opponents), finished in third place out of five teams in the NCC, and was outscored by a total of 127 to 103.

Schedule

References

North Dakota
North Dakota Fighting Hawks football seasons
North Dakota Fighting Sioux football